Shin Hyun-been (born Kwak Hyun-been on April 10, 1986) is a South Korean actress. She started her acting career by starring in the film He's on Duty (2010) and television series Warrior Baek Dong-soo (2011).

Career
Shin Hyun-been wanted to be an actress since high school, but she lacked the confidence to try. After she finished college, Shin decided to participate in  various auditions, which landed her the roles in both 2010 black comedy film He's on Duty and 2011 SBS historical action Warrior Baek Dong-soo. 

With He's on Duty, Shin won Best New Actress at the prestigious 47th Baeksang Arts Awards for her portrayal of a Vietnamese worker struggling with racism in South Korea. Shin got mainstream recognition with her role as a noble young woman who hides important map tattoo on her body with high TV ratings series Warrior Baek Dong-soo.

Shin's next breakthrough came from 2019 onward. In 2019 she was cast as the female lead of tvN's crime mystery Confession, followed by the 2020 ensemble cast thriller film Beasts Clawing at Straws in which Shin got nominated at the 41st Blue Dragon Film Awards.

After her standout role as a resident and then fellow of General Surgery in the 2020-2021 medical series Hospital Playlist, Shin accepted offers to star in several series, among them were 2022 JTBC's fantasy revenge Reborn Rich where she acted as a prosecutor of anti corruption and 2023 melodrama romance Tell Me That You Love Me, a remake of 1995 Japanese series Aishiteiru to Itte Kure.

Filmography

Film

Television series

Web series

Music video appearances

Theater

Awards and nominations

Notes

References

External links

 
 
 
 Shin Hyun-bin on Instagram

1986 births
Living people
21st-century South Korean actresses
South Korean television actresses
South Korean film actresses
Korea National University of Arts alumni
Best New Actress Paeksang Arts Award (film) winners